Nigel Coultas is a paralympic athlete from Great Britain competing mainly in category TS4 sprint events.

Nigel competed in the 1988 and 1992 Summer Paralympics as part of the Great Britain team.  At the 1988 games he won gold in the 100m, 200m and high jump breaking the world record in the high jump, he also won a silver medal in the 400m behind Finland's Harri Jauhianihen.  At the 1992 Summer Paralympics he finished second in the 100m, 200m and 400m and was part of the Great Britain team that was disqualified in the 4 × 100 m.

References

External links
 

Paralympic athletes of Great Britain
Athletes (track and field) at the 1988 Summer Paralympics
Athletes (track and field) at the 1992 Summer Paralympics
Paralympic gold medalists for Great Britain
Paralympic silver medalists for Great Britain
British male sprinters
British male high jumpers
Living people
Year of birth missing (living people)
Medalists at the 1988 Summer Paralympics
Medalists at the 1992 Summer Paralympics
Paralympic medalists in athletics (track and field)
Sprinters with limb difference
High jumpers with limb difference
Paralympic sprinters
Paralympic high jumpers